Mansoor Ahmad Khan (born; 1962) is a Pakistani diplomat who is currently serving as ambassador to Afghanistan since June 2020. He has also served as ambassador to Austria and from June 2018 to August 2020 he also served as Permanent Representative of Pakistan to the United Nations in Vienna.

References

Living people
1962 births
Ambassadors of Pakistan to Afghanistan
Ambassadors of Pakistan to Austria
Permanent Representatives of Pakistan to the United Nations